Stepanevka is a rural locality (a khutor) in Buzinovskoye Rural Settlement, Kalachyovsky District, Volgograd Oblast, Russia. The population was 228 as of 2010. There are 7 streets.

Geography 
Stepanevka is located on the left bank of the Donskaya Tsaritsa River, 64 km southeast of Kalach-na-Donu (the district's administrative centre) by road. Yarki-Rubezhny is the nearest rural locality.

References 

Rural localities in Kalachyovsky District